Visit refer as  go to see and spend time with socially.
Visit may refer to:
State visit, a formal visit by a head of state to a foreign country
Conjugal visit, in which a prisoner is permitted to spend several hours or days in private with a visitor, usually a spouse
US-VISIT, a U.S. immigration and border management system
Constable Visit, a fictional character from the Discworld novels by Terry Pratchett
VisIt, interactive parallel visualization and analysis software
Visit (internet), measures an individual's first request for a page on a firm’s server

See also
The Visit (disambiguation)
Visitation (disambiguation)